The Youth of Today is the first album from the British Jamaican reggae band Musical Youth, released in 1982. The album includes the #1 UK hit "Pass the Dutchie" which also hit number 10 on the US Billboard Hot 100 chart.

The album became their most successful release, peaking at the 23rd position of the Billboard 200 and the twenty fourth place in the UK Albums Chart 
.

Background

The album was released shortly after the success of "Pass the Dutchie", which is the album's opening song. The Youth of Today contains twelve reggae tracks, written by Freddie Waite and Musical Youth themselves, and produced by Peter Collins. Some subsequent releases omitted "Gone Straight" and "Rub 'n' Dub", and had the rest of the tracks in a re-arranged order. The album included a colourful comic story on its inner sleeve, designed by Lon Goddard, as well as a big Musical Youth poster. The cover photograph is credited to Eric Watson.

"Pass the Dutchie" was the album's lead single, released to great commercial success. It scored a number one position in no less than five countries and earned a Grammy Award nomination. A rapid follow-up, "Youth of Today", was released at the end of 1982 and achieved respectable chart success. The third single, "Never Gonna Give You Up", released in early 1983, became the band's second biggest hit in the United Kingdom and Ireland. The album's fourth and final single, "Heartbreaker", didn't fare as well and charted only in the UK, outside the top 40.

The Youth of Today was released to positive reviews and commercial success. It peaked at number 24 in the United Kingdom and number 23 in the United States. It fared much better in France and Canada, where it peaked at number 13 and number 8 respectively. The album was certified Gold in both the UK and Canada.

Track listing

Full LP release
Side A
"Pass the Dutchie" (Jackie Mittoo, Fitzroy "Bunny" Simpson, Lloyd "Judge" Ferguson) – 3:25
"Heartbreaker" (Freddie Waite) – 3:45
"Gone Straight" (Freddie Waite) – 3:08
"Blind Boy" (Musical Youth) – 3:50
"Rockers" (Musical Youth) – 3:00
"Youth of Today" (Musical Youth, Freddie Waite) – 2:56
Side B
"Young Generation" (Musical Youth) – 3:20
"Mirror Mirror" (Freddie Waite) – 3:50
"Children of Zion" (Musical Youth, Freddie Waite) – 3:00
"Never Gonna Give You Up" (Musical Youth, Freddie Waite) – 3:00
"Rub 'n' Dub" (Musical Youth) – 3:50
"Schoolgirl" (Musical Youth) – 3:20

Abridged MCA release
Side A
"Pass the Dutchie" (Jackie Mittoo, Fitzroy "Bunny" Simpson, Lloyd "Judge" Ferguson) – 3:25
"Children of Zion" (Musical Youth, Freddie Waite) – 3:00
"Blind Boy" (Musical Youth) – 3:50
"Rockers" (Musical Youth) – 3:00
"Youth of Today" (Musical Youth, Freddie Waite) – 2:56
Side B
"Young Generations" (Musical Youth) – 3:20
"Mirror Mirror" (Freddie Waite) – 3:50
"Heartbreaker" (Freddie Waite) – 3:45
"Never Gonna Give You Up" (Musical Youth, Freddie Waite) – 3:00
"Schoolgirl" (Musical Youth) – 3:20

Personnel
Musical Youth
Dennis Seaton – vocals, percussion
Freddie "Junior" Waite – drums, vocals
Kelvin Grant – guitars, vocals
Michael Grant – keyboards, vocals
Patrick Waite – bass

Technical
Julian Mendelsohn, Pete Hammond, Richard Dodd – engineer
Eric Watson – photography

Charts and certifications

Charts

Certifications and sales

References

External links
 The Youth of Today at Discogs
 The Youth of Today at Rate Your Music

1982 debut albums
Albums produced by Peter Collins (record producer)
MCA Records albums
Musical Youth albums